The 1958 Yorkshire Cup was the fifty-first occasion on which the competition had been held. Leeds won the trophy by beating Wakefield Trinity by the score of 24-20.

Background 

This season there were no junior/amateur clubs taking part, no new entrants and no "leavers" and so the total of entries remained the  same at sixteen.
This in turn resulted in no byes in the first round.

Competition and results

Round 1 
Involved  8 matches (with no byes) and 16 clubs

Round 1 - replays  
Involved  1 match and 2 clubs

Round 2 - quarterfinals 
Involved 4 matches and 8 clubs

Round 3 – semifinals  
Involved 2 matches and 4 clubs

Final 

The 1958 Yorkshire Cup final was played at Odsal in the City of Bradford, now in West Yorkshire. The attendance was 26,927 and receipts were £3,833.

Teams and scorers 

Scoring - Try = three (3) points - Goal = two (2) points - Drop goal = two (2) points

The road to success

See also 
Rugby league county cups

References

External links
Saints Heritage Society
1896–97 Northern Rugby Football Union season at wigan.rlfans.com
Hull&Proud Fixtures & Results 1896/1897
Widnes Vikings - One team, one passion Season In Review - 1896-97
The Northern Union at warringtonwolves.org

1958 in English rugby league
RFL Yorkshire Cup